François-Xavier Bagnoud Observatory (Observatoire François-Xavier Bagnoud) is an astronomical observatory. It is a non-profit organisation funded by Association François-Xavier Bagnoud.

It has  and  telescopes, as well as a heliostat, a weather station, a planetarium and a planet trail between the observatory and the funicular.

References 

Astronomical observatories in Switzerland